
Year 638 (DCXXXVIII) was a common year starting on Thursday (link will display the full calendar) of the Julian calendar. The denomination 638 for this year has been used since the early medieval period, when the Anno Domini calendar era became the prevalent method in Europe for naming years.

Events 
 By place 
 Byzantine Empire 
 Emperor Heraclius creates a buffer zone (or no man's land) in the heartland of Asia Minor. In the mountainous terrain of Anatolia, the Byzantine forces develop a system of defensive guerrilla warfare. The strategy is known as ‘shadowing warfare’, as it avoids battle with major Muslim invaders, and instead attacks raiding parties on their return when they are laden with booty, captured livestock or prisoners.
 July 4 – Heraklonas, age 12, son of Heraclius, obtains (through the influence of his mother Martina) the title of Augustus. This brings him in rivalry with his elder half-brother Constantine.   
 Heraclius issues his Ekthesis, espousing the Monothelete doctrine (that there is only one will in Christ), and setting it forth as the official doctrine of the Eastern Orthodox Church. The Ekthesis is vigorously opposed, notably by Maximus the Confessor.

 Britain 
 King Oswald and his Northumbrian army besiege and conquer Edinburgh (Scotland). His half-brother, Oswiu of Bernicia, marries Princess Rhiainfelt, heiress of North Rheged ("Old North"). Northumbria embraces North Rheged in a peaceful takeover, and Oswiu becomes a sub-king (approximate date).

 Arabian Empire 
 January – The Plague of Amwas breaks out.
 Autumn – The Arabian forces under Abu Ubaidah ibn al-Jarrah storm Caesarea Maritima, capital of Byzantine Palestine, and effect their final capture of Ascalon (modern Israel). Caliph Umar I stops the Muslim invasion, and appoints Abu Ubaidah governor of Syria.
 Arab-Byzantine War: The invading Rashidun army under Khalid ibn al-Walid moves into Anatolia, conquering (without strong Byzantine resistance) the cities of Kahramanmaraş, Caesarea Cappadociae, Sebastia, and Malatya (west of the Taurus Mountains). Arab forces march into Armenia, where they capture the cities Edessa and Amida up to the Ararat plain. 
 Umar I dismisses Khalid ibn al-Walid after the conquest of Syria, owing to his ever-growing fame and influence. He wants the Muslims to know that victory comes from God, not his general.   
 Abu Musa al-Asha'ari, companion (sahabah) of Muhammad, establishes Hafar al-Batin, located in the northeastern region of the Arabian Peninsula. He orders the digging for new wells, along this desert route that Muslims travel from Iraq to Mecca for the Hajj (pilgrimage).

 Asia 
 The Tibetan Empire, seeking an alliance through marriage with Tang dynasty China, launches an attack on Songzhou that is repelled by Chinese forces, but is followed by the marriage of the Chinese Princess Wencheng to Tibetan ruler Songtsän Gampo.

 By topic 
 Arts and sciences 
 The Islamic calendar is introduced by Abu Musa al-Asha'ari. He convinces Umar I to make notes of an era for Muslims. 
 March 22 – Year 0 of the Burmese calendar, based on the Chula Sakarat, is also used in the mainland of Southeast Asia.

 Religion 
 October 12 – Pope Honorius I dies at Rome after a 13-year reign, and is succeeded by Severinus, but the Byzantine emperor Heraclius will delay the new pope's consecration until May 640. 
 December 20 – Pyrrhus I becomes patriarch of Constantinople, after the death of Sergius I. He has been an advocate of Monothelitism and a close friend of Heraclius.

Births 
 Huineng, Chinese Zen Buddhist patriarch of the Tang dynasty (d. 713)

Deaths 
 March 11 – Sophronius, patriarch of Jerusalem
 October 12 – Pope Honorius I
 December 9 – Sergius I, patriarch of Constantinople
 Qin Shubao, general of the Tang dynasty
 Yu Shinan, calligrapher and official (b. 558)

References

Sources